These are some of the key weapons of the Falklands War used by both sides.

Aircraft and weapons

Argentina

Combat 

 A-4B/C/Q Skyhawk (Argentine Air Force, Argentine Naval Aviation)
 Aermacchi MB-326 (Argentine Naval Aviation)
 Aermacchi MB-339 (Argentine Naval Aviation)
 Dassault Mirage III (Argentine Air Force)
 Dassault Super Étendard (Argentine Naval Aviation)
 FMA IA 58A Pucará (Argentine Air Force)
 IAI Dagger (Argentine Air Force)

Bomber 

 Canberra B.62 (Argentine Air Force)

Maritime Patrol 

 S-2E Tracker (Argentine Naval Aviation)
 SP-2H Neptune (Argentine Naval Aviation)

Reconnaissance 

 Cessna Citation I (Phoenix Squadron)
 Cessna Citation II (Phoenix Squadron)
 Hawker Siddeley HS.125 (Phoenix Squadron)
 Learjet 24 (Phoenix Squadron)
 Learjet 35 (Argentine Air Force, Phoenix Squadron)
 Learjet 36 (Phoenix Squadron)
 Lockheed L-188PF Electra (Argentine Naval Aviation)
 P-95 Bandeirulha (Argentine Naval Aviation)
 T-34C Turbo Mentor (Argentine Naval Aviation)
 Boeing 707-320C (Argentine Air Force)

Tanker 

 KC-130H Hercules (Argentine Air Force)

Transport 

 Aero Commander 500B/500S/680FL/690A/690B/690C (Phoenix Squadron)
 BAC 1-11 (Austral Líneas Aéreas)
 Boeing 737-200 (Aerolíneas Argentinas)
 Britten-Norman BN-2 Islander (Argentine Naval Aviation)
 C-47 Skytrain (Phoenix Squadron)
 C-130H Hercules (Argentine Air Force)
 de Havilland Canada DHC-6 Twin Otter (Argentine Air Force)
 Douglas DC-3 (Phoenix Squadron)
 FMA IA 50 Guaraní II (Phoenix Squadron)
 Fokker F-27-400M (Argentine Air Force)
 Fokker F-28-1000C/3000C (Argentine Air Force, Argentine Naval Aviation)
 Mitsubishi MU-2 (Phoenix Squadron)
 Piper Aerostar (Phoenix Squadron)
 Swearingen Merlin (Phoenix Squadron)

Helicopters 

 Agusta A109A (Argentine Army Aviation, Phoenix Squadron)
 Aérospatiale Alouette III (Argentine Naval Aviation)
 Aérospatiale SA 330 Puma (Argentine Army Aviation, Argentine Naval Prefecture)
 Bell 205 (Phoenix Squadron)
 Bell 206 (Phoenix Squadron)
 Bell 212 (Argentine Air Force, Phoenix Squadron)
 CH-47C Chinook (Argentine Army Aviation)
 H-34 Choctaw (Phoenix Squadron)
 McDonnell Douglas MD500 (Phoenix Squadron)
 Messerschmitt-Bölkow-Blohm Bo 105 (Phoenix Squadron)
 SH-3 Sea King (Argentine Naval Aviation, Phoenix Squadron)
 Short SC.7 Skyvan (Argentine Naval Prefecture)
 UH-1H Iroquois (Argentine Army Aviation)
 Westland Lynx Mk.23 (Argentine Naval Aviation)

Armament 
Machine guns and cannons
 7.62×51mm NATO FN Browning machine gun (FMA IA 58A Pucará)
 20×110mm USN Hispano-Suiza HS.804 cannon (FMA IA 58A Pucará)
 20×110mm USN Colt Mk 12 cannon (A-4B/C/Q Skyhawk)
 30×113mm DEFA cannon (Dassault Mirage III, IAI Dagger)
Rockets
 127mm Zuni FFAR (Aermacchi MB-339)
Air-to-air missiles
 AIM-9B Sidewinder (A-4Q Skyhawk)
 Rafael Shafrir 2 (A-4C Skyhawk, IAI Dagger)

 R.530 (Dassault Mirage III)
 R.550 Magic (Dassault Mirage III)
Air-to-surface missiles
 Aérospatiale AM.39 Exocet - The Exocet is probably the most famous weapon of the war, sinking two British ships and damaging a third. Operated by both sides the missile was used by the Argentine Navy either air launched from Dassault Super Étendard jets and from an improvised land launcher.
Bombs
 Mk. 82 General Purpose Bomb (A-4Q Skyhawk)
 1,000 lb General-Purpose Bomb (A-4B/C Skyhawk, IAI Dagger, Canberra B.62)
 250kg Expal BR/BRP General-Purpose Bomb (A-4B/C Skyhawk, IAI Dagger)
 125kg PG (FMA IA 58A Pucará)
 Napalm (FMA IA 58A Pucará)

United Kingdom

Combat 

 Phantom FGR.2 (Royal Air Force)
 Harrier GR.3 (Royal Air Force)
 Sea Harrier FRS.1 (Fleet Air Arm)

Bomber 

 Vulcan B.2 (Royal Air Force)

Maritime Patrol 

 Nimrod MR.2 (Royal Air Force)

Reconnaissance 

 Canberra PR.9 (Royal Air Force)

Tanker 

 Victor K.2 (Royal Air Force)

Transport 

 Hercules C.1 (Royal Air Force)
 VC10 C.1 (Royal Air Force)
 Short Belfast (TAC HeavyLift)

Helicopters 

 Gazelle AH.1 (Army Air Corps, Royal Marines Aviation)
 Scout AH.1 (Army Air Corps, Royal Marines Aviation)
 Wessex HAS.3/HU.5 (Fleet Air Arm)
 Lynx HAS.2/HAS.3 (Fleet Air Arm)
 Sea King HAS.2/HAS.2A/HAS.5/HAR.3 (Fleet Air Arm/Royal Air Force)
 Wasp HAS.1 (Fleet Air Arm)
 Chinook HC.1 (Royal Air Force)

Armament 
Guns and cannons
 L44A1 GPMG (Scout, Lynx, Sea King, Wasp)
 M60 machine gun (Chinook)
 30×111mm ADEN cannon (Harrier, Sea Harrier)
 M134 Minigun (Chinook)
Rockets
 SNEB (Harrier, Sea Harrier, Gazelle)
Air-to-air missiles
 AIM-9D/G Sidewinder (Phantom)
 AIM-9L Sidewinder (Harrier, Sea Harrier, Nimrod)
Air-to-surface missiles
 AGM-45 Shrike (Vulcan)
 BAe Sea Skua (Lynx) - A light anti-ship missile, fired from Lynx helicopters, its warhead is only 20 kg compared with the Exocet's 165 kg. However, hits from three Sea Skua missiles badly damaged the Argentine tug ARA Alferez Sobral.
 Nord SS.11 (Scout)
 Nord AS.12 (Wasp, Wessex) - A French light anti-ship missile, fired from Westland Wasp helicopters. Like the Sea Skua, its small 28 kg warhead meant that it could not destroy ships outright; however, it could disable smaller vessels. On 25 April 1982 it contributed towards damaging and disabling the Argentine Submarine the ARA Santa Fe. A total of nine missiles were fired at the submarine trapped on the surface by anti-submarine torpedoes circling just under the hull. Of the missiles fired four hit, four missed and one failed to launch. Two of the missiles that hit the target failed to detonate on impact, instead punching a hole through the slender conning tower and exploding on the far side.
Bombs
 GBU-48 Enhanced Paveway II (Harrier)
 BL755 (Sea Harrier, Nimrod)
 1,000 lb General-Purpose Bomb (Vulcan, Harrier, Sea Harrier)
Torpedoes and Depth Charges
 Mk. 46 torpedo (Nimrod, Sea King, Wasp)
 Mk. 11 depth charge (Nimrod, Sea King)

Ships

Argentina

Argentine Navy

Submarines 

 Balao-class submarine (ARA Santa Fe)
 Type 209 submarine (ARA San Luis)

Aircraft carriers 

 1942 Design Royal Navy Light Fleet Carrier [Colossus-class] (ARA Veinticinco de Mayo)

Amphibious warfare ships 

 ARA Cabo San Antonio

Cruisers 

 Brooklyn-class cruiser (ARA General Belgrano)

Destroyers 

 Gearing-class destroyer (ARA Comodoro Py)
 Allen M. Sumner-class destroyer (ARA Comodoro Seguí, ARA Hipólito Bouchard, ARA Piedrabuena)
 Type 42 destroyer (ARA Santísima Trinidad, ARA Hércules)

Corvettes 

 Drummond-class corvette (ARA Drummond, ARA Guerrico, ARA Granville)

Tugboats 

 Sotoyomo-class tugboat (ARA Alferez Sobral, ARA Comodoro Somellera)
 Abnaki-class tugboat (ARA Francisco de Gurruchaga)

Auxiliary ships 

 ARA Punta Médanos
 ARA Almirante Irízar
 ARA Isla de los Estados
 ARA Bahía Paraíso
 Bahía Aguirre-class (ARA Bahía Buen Suceso)
 Klickitat-class tanker (ARA Punta Delgada)

Argentine Coast Guard

Patrol vessels 

 Z-28 naval patrol craft (GC Islas Malvinas, GC Río Iguazú)

Merchant vessels 

 Formosa
 Río Carcarañá
 Yehuín
 Río Cincel
 Mar del Norte
 Lago Argentino
 Puerto Rosales
 Narwal
 María Alejandra
 Constanza
 Invierno
 Capitán Canepa
 María Luisa
 Usurbil
 Mar Azul
 Río de la Plata II

Falkland Islands Company ships seized by the Argentine Navy 

 Forrest
 Monsunen
 Penelope

United Kingdom

Royal Navy

Submarines 

 Swiftsure-class submarine (HMS Spartan, HMS Splendid)
 Churchill-class submarine (HMS Conqueror, HMS Courageous)
 Valiant-class submarine (HMS Valiant)
 Oberon-class submarine (HMS Onyx)

Aircraft carriers 

 Centaur-class aircraft carrier (HMS Hermes)
 Invincible-class aircraft carrier (HMS Invincible)

Amphibious warfare ships 

 Fearless-class landing platform dock (HMS Fearless, HMS Intrepid)

Destroyers 

 Type 82 destroyer (HMS Bristol)
 Type 42 destroyer (HMS Sheffield, HMS Coventry, HMS Glasgow, HMS Cardiff, HMS Exeter)
 County-class destroyer (HMS Glamorgan, HMS Antrim)

Frigates 

 Type 22 frigate (HMS Brilliant, HMS Broadsword)
 Type 21 frigate (HMS Active, HMS Alacrity, HMS Antelope, HMS Ardent, HMS Ambuscade, HMS Avenger, HMS Arrow)
 Leander-class frigate (HMS Andromeda, HMS Argonaut, HMS Minerva, HMS Penelope)
 Rothesay-class frigate (HMS Yarmouth, HMS Plymouth)

Offshore patrol vessels 

 Castle-class patrol vessel (HMS Leeds Castle, HMS Dumbarton Castle)

Ice patrol vessels 

 HMS Endurance

Ambulance ships 

 Hecla-class survey vessel (HMS Hecla, HMS Herald, HMS Hydra)

Mine countermeasures vessels 

 HMS Cordella
 HMS Farnella
 HMS Junella
 HMS Northella
 HMS Pict

Patrol vessels 

 HMS Tiger Bay (Captured GC Islas Malvinas)

Royal Fleet Auxiliary

Tankers 

 Rover-class replenishment tanker (RFA Blue Rover)
 Ol-class replenishment tanker (RFA Olna, RFA Olmeda)
 Leaf-class replenishment tanker (RFA Appleleaf, RFA Brambleleaf, RFA Bayleaf, RFA Plumleaf, RFA Pearleaf)
 Tide-class replenishment tanker (RFA Tidespring, RFA Tidepool)

Amphibious warfare ships 

 Round Table-class landing ship logistics (RFA Sir Bedivere, RFA Sir Galahad, RFA Sir Geraint, RFA Sir Lancelot, RFA Sir Percivale, RFA Sir Tristram)

Supply ships 

 Regent-class supply ship (RFA Regent, RFA Resource)
 Fort-class replenishment ship (RFA Fort Rosalie, RFA Fort Austin)
 Ness-class combat stores ship (RFA Stromness)

Naval aviation support ships 

 RFA Engadine

Royal Maritime Auxiliary Service

Tugboats 

 RMAS Typhoon
 RMAS Goosander

British Merchant Navy

Ocean liners and cruise ships 

 Queen Elizabeth 2
 Canberra
 Uganda
 Cunard Countess

Roll-on-roll-off ferries 

 Elk
 Baltic Ferry
 Europic Ferry
 Nordic Ferry
 Norland
 Rangatira
 St Edmund
 Tor Caledonia

Container ships 

 Astronomer
 Atlantic Conveyer
 Atlantic Causeway
 Contender Bezant
 Myrmidon

Freighters 

 Avelona Star
 Geestport
 Laertes
 Lycaon
 Saxonia
 Strathewe
 St Helena

Tankers 

 Alvega
 Anco Charger
 Balder London
 British Avon
 British Dart
 British Esk
 British Tamar
 British Tay
 British Test
 British Trent
 British Wye
 Eburna
 Fort Toronto
 G.A.Walker
 Scottish Eagle

Tugboats, repair and support ships 

 British Enterprise III
 Dan Lifter
 Iris
 Irishman
 Salvageman
 Stena Inspector
 Stena Seaspread
 Wimpey Seahorse
 Yorkshireman

Royal Marines 

 Landing Craft Utility Mk.9
 Landing Craft Vehicle Personnel Mk.2
 Rigid Raider

British Army 

 Mexeflote
 Gemini boat

Falkland Islands Company 
 Forrest
 Monsunen
 Penelope
 John Biscoe

Anti-air

Argentina 
Anti-aircraft guns

Argentine forces deployed a substantial number of anti-aircraft guns around Stanley and Goose Green airfields.

 40mm Bofors Automatic Gun L/60
 35mm Oerlikon GDF
 30mm Hispano Suiza
 20mm Rheinmetall Mk 20 Rh-202
Naval surface-to-air missiles
 Sea Dart - British naval medium-range surface-to-air missile. It proved unable to engage low-altitude targets, such as Argentine A4 Skyhawk aircraft and Exocet missiles. However, it did achieve several long-range kills.
 Sea Cat
Land-based surface-to-air missiles
 Roland - Argentine forces deployed a single launcher to defend Stanley airport; it succeeded in shooting down one Sea Harrier (XZ456) on 1 June 1982 above 10,000 feet (3000 m). The presence of the launcher forced British aircraft to operate above its envelope – typically at 18,000 feet (5,500 m) which severely reduced the accuracy of bombs dropped on the airport. The single Roland unit was later shipped back to Britain for analysis and testing.
 Tiger Cat - Argentine land forces had a total of 7 Tigercat missile launchers (Ex RAF); there were several near misses, and possibly one Sea Harrier had its engine damaged by shrapnel from one of the missiles.

United Kingdom 
Naval surface-to-air missiles
 Sea Dart - British naval medium-range surface-to-air missile. It proved unable to engage low-altitude targets, such as Argentine A4 Skyhawk aircraft and Exocet missiles. However, it did achieve several long-range kills.
 Sea Wolf - British naval short-range low-altitude surface-to-air missile, used to complement the longer-range Sea Dart. It proved capable of engaging low-flying aircraft.
 Sea Cat
 Sea Slug -  Long range, high altitude anti-aircraft missile system of the 1950s, was not used against aircraft but for bombardment of positions near Port Stanley by the Royal Navy ships equipped with it.
Land-based surface-to-air missiles
 Rapier - British surface-to-air missile developed for the British Army to replace their towed Bofors 40/L70 anti-aircraft guns. Its presence acted as a deterrent, especially after the deployment of Blind Fire systems around Port San Carlos.
 Tiger Cat

Anti-ship

Argentina 
Land-based surface-to-surface missiles
 Aérospatiale AM.39 Exocet (improvised)

Electronic warfare and communications

Argentina 

 AN/TPS-43
 AN/TPS-44
 Skyguard
 Super Fledermaus
 RASIT

United Kingdom 

 Blindfire

 Clansman

Artillery and mortars

Argentina 
Artillery

 CITER 155 mm L33 gun
 OTO Melara Mod 56

Mortars

 FM 81mm mortar
 FM 120mm mortar

United Kingdom 
Artillery

 L118 light gun

Mortars

 L16 81mm mortar

Vehicles

Argentina 

 LVTP-7
 LARC-V
 Panhard AML-90
 KrAZ-256
 Mercedes-Benz MB 1112/13/14
 Mercedes-Benz G-Class
 Unimog

United Kingdom 

 FV101 Scorpion
 FV106 Samson
 FV107 Scimitar
 Centurion BARV
 Bandvagn 202
 Land Rover 101 Forward Control
 Land Rover 101 Forward Control Ambulance 
 Land Rover Series IIA
 Land Rover Series III ((88 and 109 inch)
 Land Rover Series III Ambulance
 Bedford MK
 Eager Beaver Air Portable Fork Lift Truck
 Can-Am Bombardier Motorcycle
 Muir-Hill Loader

Infantry weapons

Argentina

Pistols 

 Browning Hi-Power

 M1911A1 pistol
 Colt Argentine Model 1927
 Ballester–Molina

Submachine guns 

 P.A.M. 1
 P.A.M. 2
 FMK-3
 Halcón ML-63
 Uzi
 L34A1 Sterling (Suppressed)

Rifles 

 FN FAL 50.61
 Beretta BM-59E
 M14 rifle
 M16A1 rifle
 CAR-15
 Mauser Modelo Argentino 1909

Machine guns 

 FN FAL 50.41
 FN MAG
 M2 Browning

Anti-tank 

 Model 1968 recoilless gun
 M67 recoilless rifle
 Instalaza M65

Anti-air 

 9K32 Strela-2 (SA-7 Grail)
 Blowpipe

Grenades 

 FMK-2

Anti-personnel mines 

 FMK-1
 SB-33
 No. 4
 P4B

Anti-tank mines 

 C3B
 FMK-3
 M1 mine
 M1
 No. 6
 SB-81

United Kingdom

Pistols 

 L9A1 Browning
 L47A1 Walther

Submachine guns 

 L34A1 Sterling (Suppressed)
 L2A3 Sterling
 L92A1 HK

Rifles 

 L1A1 SLR
 M16A1 rifle  
 Colt CAR-15 Commando 
 L42A1 sniper rifle
 Parker-Hale M82 
 L74A1 Remington

Machine guns 

 L7A2 GPMG
 Enfield L4A2 Bren
 L2A1 HMG

Grenade launchers 

 M203 grenade launcher
 M79 grenade launcher

Anti-tank 

 MILAN anti-tank guided missile
 L1A1 Rocket 66 mm HEAT 
 L6 WOMBAT
 L14A1 Carl Gustav recoilless rifle

Anti-air 

 FIM-92 Stinger
 Blowpipe

References

 Falklands Air War, Chris Hobson, 
 Hispano-Argentina (HAFDASA Manufacturing, Argentina)

Falklands War
Falklands War
Falklands War